Mike Walker (born July 5, 1958) is a former Canadian Football League defensive tackle who played ten seasons for two teams. He was a CFL All-Star three times. He was a part of the Hamilton Tiger-Cats 1986 Grey Cup winning team.  Since retiring he has been a defensive line coach for the Washington State Cougars, Toronto Argonauts, Edmonton Eskimos and Saskatchewan Roughriders.

He was inducted into the Canadian Football Hall of Fame as a player in 2021.

References

1958 births
Living people
Canadian football defensive linemen
Edmonton Elks coaches
Edmonton Elks players
Hamilton Tiger-Cats players
Players of Canadian football from Indianapolis
Washington State Cougars football coaches
Washington State Cougars football players
Canadian Football Hall of Fame inductees